Yanfang Line of the Beijing Subway is a rapid transit line in Beijing. It was opened on December 30, 2017.

History
Construction of the Yanfang Line was scheduled to commence in September 2011 and be completed by 2013.  On October 17, 2011, the Ministry of Environmental Protection declined to approve plans for the line citing lack of approval for the project from the National Development and Reform Commission and uncertain environmental impact of the line on the South–North Water Transfer Project which has a channel and reservoir in Fangshan District.  As a result, the onset of construction was delayed to at least the end of 2013.

Construction on Yanfang Line was started in April 2014. The line was scheduled to open in 2017. The line opened on December 30, 2017.

Route

Currently only the main line is operational, while the branch line is under planning.

Stations

Rolling Stock

Technology
The line is the first in Beijing to be capable of unattended train operations, and the first in China to exclusively use subsystems developed by domestic manufacturers.

Future Development
The  branch line of Yanfang line, from Raolefu station to Zhoukoudian Town station is under planning. Due to low passenger flow, the branch line will not be built in the short-term planning.
In addition, Beijing Subway is evaluating the possibile merge with the Fangshan line.

References 

Beijing Subway lines
Railway lines opened in 2017
2017 establishments in China
750 V DC railway electrification